Dolarddyn Crossing railway station served the village of Castle Caereinion, in the historical county of Montgomeryshire, Wales, from 1929 to 1931 on the Welshpool and Llanfair Light Railway.

History 
The station was opened on 8 July 1929 by the Great Western Railway, although it was in the company timetable in July 1904 and used only for picnic parties. It became a regular stop on 16 March 1929 and the full service followed a few months later. Its full use was short-lived as it closed to passengers, along with the line's passenger service, on 9 February 1931.

References 

Welshpool and Llanfair Light Railway
Disused railway stations in Powys
Former Great Western Railway stations
Railway stations in Great Britain opened in 1929
Railway stations in Great Britain closed in 1931
1904 establishments in Wales
1931 disestablishments in Wales